Harald Bjerg Emborg   (1920–1982) was a Danish composer.

See also
List of Danish composers

References
This article was initially translated from the Danish Wikipedia.

Male composers
1920 births
1982 deaths
20th-century Danish composers
20th-century Danish male musicians